The Garn–St Germain Depository Institutions Act of 1982 (enacted October 15, 1982) is an Act of Congress that deregulated savings and loan associations and allowed banks to provide adjustable-rate mortgage loans. It is disputed whether the act was a mitigating or contributing factor in the savings and loan crisis of the late 1980s.

The bill, whose full title was "An Act to revitalize the housing industry by strengthening the financial stability of home mortgage lending institutions and ensuring the availability of home mortgage loans," was a Reagan Administration initiative.

The bill is named after its sponsors, Congressman Fernand St. Germain, Democrat of Rhode Island, and Senator Jake Garn, Republican of Utah.  The bill had broad support in Congress, with co-sponsors including Charles Schumer and Steny Hoyer. The bill passed overwhelmingly, by a margin of 272–91 in the House.

An important consumer change was to allow anyone to place real estate, consisting of one to four dwelling units, into their own trust without triggering the due-on-sale clause. The due-on-sale clause allows lenders to foreclose on a current loan upon transfer to another.  This greatly facilitates the use of trusts to pass property to heirs and minors.  It may also protect the property of wealthy or risky owners against the possibility of future lawsuits or creditors, because the trust owns the property, not the individuals at risk. The bill states "... a lender may not exercise its option pursuant to a due-on-sale clause upon ... a transfer into an inter vivos trust in which the borrower is and remains a beneficiary and which does not relate to a transfer of rights of occupancy in the property[.]" (The Garn St. Germain Depository Institutions Act of 1982, (U.S.C.) 1701j-3(d)(8).)

Title VIII of the act, Alternative Mortgage Transactions, allowed banks to provide adjustable-rate mortgage loans.

The bill's passage is considered an important shift in the Democratic Party's positioning on economic regulation, as the party had historically defended New Deal era financial regulations, but had now come to favor financial deregulation. According to a 2022 study, this shift happened as a consequence of the congressional reforms of the 1970s, which undermined parochial and Southern populist interests within the Democratic Party. These parochial and populist interests favored a decentralized banking system. The party subsequently pursued deregulatory reforms that it perceived as beneficial to savers and consumers.

See also

 
 Securities regulation in the United States
 Commodity Futures Trading Commission
 Securities commission
 Chicago Stock Exchange
 Financial regulation
 List of financial regulatory authorities by country
 NASDAQ
 New York Stock Exchange
 Stock exchange
 Regulation D (SEC)
Related legislation
 1933 – Securities Act of 1933
 1934 – Securities Exchange Act of 1934
 1938 – Temporary National Economic Committee (establishment)
 1939 – Trust Indenture Act of 1939
 1940 – Investment Advisers Act of 1940
 1940 – Investment Company Act of 1940
 1968 – Williams Act (Securities Disclosure Act)
 1975 – Securities Acts Amendments of 1975
 1980 - Depository Institutions Deregulation and Monetary Control Act
 1989 - Financial Institutions Reform, Recovery, and Enforcement Act of 1989
 1999 – Gramm–Leach–Bliley Act 
 2000 – Commodity Futures Modernization Act of 2000
 2002 – Sarbanes–Oxley Act
 2006 – Credit Rating Agency Reform Act of 2006
 2010 – Dodd–Frank Wall Street Reform and Consumer Protection Act

References

Further reading

External links
 Bill summary and status 
 FDIC notes on the bill
 Public Law 97-320, 97th Congress, H.R. 6267: Garn–St Germain Depository Institutions Act of 1982

1982 in American law
United States federal banking legislation
Savings and loan crisis
97th United States Congress
Acts of the 97th United States Congress